Adel Bagrou  is a town and commune in the Hodh Ech Chargui Region of south-eastern Mauritania. It is located near the border with Mali.

In 2013 it had a population of 47,829.

References

Communes of Hodh Ech Chargui Region